Jesús Vicente García Pitarch Marco (born 14 November 1963) is a Spanish retired footballer who played as a left winger.

Playing career
Also known as Suso in his playing days, García Pitarch was born in La Pobla de Vallbona, Valencian Community, and played 120 La Liga games over the course of six seasons (21 goals), spending two apiece with local Valencia CF, RCD Español and CD Logroñés. He made his debut in the competition on 8 January 1984 in a 0–3 home loss against Sporting de Gijón where he featured 16 minutes, and finished his first season with the Che with 16 games and six goals.

Whilst with Catalonia's Español, García Pitarch missed the entire 1986–87 campaign due to a bout of glomerulonephritis. He went on to recover fully and, in Segunda División, represented UE Figueres, Orihuela Deportiva CF (scoring a career-best 22 goals in 1990–91 but still suffering team relegation, due to irregularities), CP Mérida and Villarreal CF.

Post-retirement
García Pitarch majored in law in 1987, opening a firm in his hometown. After being in charge of the club's academy, he worked as a director of football with Valencia, replacing Javier Subirats and remaining in office until June 2004 – initially being fired in December of the previous year – leaving as manager Rafael Benítez.

During five seasons, García Pitarch worked in the same capacity at Atlético Madrid, being responsible for signing the likes of Diego Forlán and José Antonio Reyes. On 4 July 2012, he was elected president of Hércules CF in the second division, also being the main decider in the football department.

García Pitarch left the Estadio José Rico Pérez after just one year, going on to work as director of football with Real Zaragoza, Baniyas Club (United Arab Emirates) and Valencia. He left his role with the latter club on 7 January 2017.

On 9 October 2018, García Pitarch was appointed as sporting director of Aston Villa, where his key duties included player recruitment. On 27 July 2020, he was dismissed from this role after chief executive Christian Purslow carried out a "long-term strategic review of how the club can improve its recruitment".

References

External links

1963 births
Living people
People from Horta Oest
Sportspeople from the Province of Valencia
Spanish footballers
Footballers from the Valencian Community
Association football wingers
La Liga players
Segunda División players
Segunda División B players
Tercera División players
Valencia CF Mestalla footballers
CF Gandía players
Valencia CF players
RCD Espanyol footballers
UE Figueres footballers
Orihuela Deportiva CF footballers
CD Logroñés footballers
CP Mérida footballers
Villarreal CF players
Real Murcia players
Spain under-21 international footballers
Spain amateur international footballers
Spanish football chairmen and investors
Valencia CF non-playing staff
Aston Villa F.C. non-playing staff
Spanish expatriate sportspeople in the United Arab Emirates
Spanish expatriate sportspeople in England